Genealogia sanctae Hedwigis is a medieval genealogy of Hedwig of Silesia which was included in Vita sanctae Hedwigis. It was written in 1300. The author of Genealogia was a Franciscan from Wrocław. There is a theory that the author was Henryk of Brena, a relative of Hedwig.

References 
Kazimierz Jasiński, Genealogia św. Jadwigi. Studium źródłoznawcze

History books about Poland
History of Silesia
Hedwig
Medieval genealogies and succession lists